At least three ships of the French Navy have been named Algérien:

 , a 
 , an  launched in 1917 and struck in 1936.
 , a  launched as USS Cronin in 1943 and transferred to France in 1944. She was renamed Oise in 1962 and returned to the US Navy in 1964.

French Navy ship names